Maders is a hamlet west of Kelly Bray in the parish of South Hill (where the population of the 2011 census was included) in east Cornwall, England.

References

Hamlets in Cornwall